Royal Gold is one of the world's leading precious metals stream and royalty companies engaged in the acquisition and management of precious metal streams, royalties and similar production-based interests. Royal Gold owns a large portfolio of producing, development, evaluation and exploration stage streams and royalties on properties located in some of the world's most prolific gold regions and operated by some of the most well-known companies in the mining industry.

Streams and royalties can be acquired outright from either a resource company or a private party. In the case of new streams or royalties that are sold to raise financing, the capital provided by Royal Gold is typically directed by our partner companies towards three broad uses:

- Investing directly in mining assets (for example, for mine development and construction, mine expansion, or funding exploration work);

- Providing liquidity to strengthen balance sheets;

- Funding merger and acquisition activity.

As a streaming and royalty company, Royal Gold is less exposed to operational and capital cost risks than mine operators.
Royal Gold's business has over a short period of time become more internationalized and diversified (in 2010, 60% of revenue came from abroad compared to 44% the year before).  In 2010, 40% of revenue came from the USA compared to 79% in 2008; Canada down to 4% from 27% in 2008, however, most assets in Canada are in the developmental phase while Africa nearly tripled to 29%.

In the 2009 edition of the Fortune Small Business Magazine (FSB) it ranked 10th among the fastest growing small businesses in the United States, 79 spots higher than in 2008.

Royal Gold reported operating cash flow of $340.8 million during fiscal 2020 as well as $498.8 million in revenue and earnings per share of $3.04.

History
In the 1980s, the company was named Royal Resources, Inc., and was an oil-exploration company.  In 1986, H. Stanley Dempsey, a board member of the public company, transformed the company into a gold mining company and renamed the company Royal Gold, Inc.  Dempsey served as Royal Gold's chief executive officer through 2006, as its executive chairman through 2008, and its non-executive chairman through 2014.  Dempsey was inducted into the National Mining Hall of Fame in 2016.

2010 was the year the company experienced the most growth with over a billion of the $1.86 billion in assets it has (September 2010) added during the year.  In 2007 it purchased an interest in the Penasquito mine which did not begin producing until 2010.

February 2010 completed the acquisition of another royalty company, IRC which has claims in Chile (Pascua Lama) and Canada (Voisey's Bay).  International Royalty Company was quick to accept the $702 million deal from Royal Gold after Franco-Nevada attempted a hostile $640 million takeover.

By the end of the 2020 fiscal year, the company owns interests on 41 producing mines (June 30, 2020).

In July 2022, Royal Gold acquired Great Bear Royalties for $153 million.

Principal Properties
Royal Gold's principal producing properties are generally in production and are the most significant contributors of revenue to its portfolio. These include:

- A gold stream for 100% of payable gold (until 900,000 ounces delivered, 50% thereafter) produced from the Andacollo mine in Chile;

- A gold stream for 7.5% of payable gold (until 990,000 ounces delivered, 3.75% thereafter) and a silver stream for 75% of payable silver (until 50 million ounces delivered, 37.5% thereafter) produced from the Pueblo Viejo mine in the Dominican Republic ;

- A gold stream for 35% of payable gold and a copper stream for 18.75% of payable copper produced from the Mount Milligan mine in Canada;

- A gold stream for 10.5% of payable gold (until an aggregate 240,000 ounces delivered, 5.5% thereafter) from the Wassa, Prestea and Bogoso mines in Ghana;

- A 2% net smelter return royalty on all metals at the Peñasquito mine in Mexico;

- Multiple royalties at the Cortez mine in Nevada, United States.

Royal Gold's principal development properties are not in production but are expected to become significant contributors of revenue with plans in place to achieve production status. These include:

- A silver stream for 80% of payable silver (can be increased to 100% prior to production at the election of Khoemacau Copper Mining (Pty.) Limited) produced from the Khoemacau property in Botswana.

Mines producing metals other than gold
In the first nine months of 2010 the largest producing mines that it has a royalty interest on were Leeville for gold (321,247 ounces), Robinson for copper (83.1 million pounds), Penasquito for lead (56 million pounds), zinc (86.3 million pounds), nickel (37.2 million pounds) and silver (8.5 million ounces).  In addition to the following properties there are another 19 in production that only produce gold.

In the last three months of the 2011 calendar year Royal Gold relied on Andacollo (23.5%), Voisey's Bay (17.5%), Penasquito (9.2%), Holt (6.1%) for more than half of its revenue.  Those mines produced in total 92,358 ounces of gold during the quarter up from 65,862 ounces during the same period a year earlier, only two of them produced anything besides gold.  Voisey's Bay and Las Cruces are the only major mining operations that don't produce gold.

Acquisition 

 July 12, 2022 - Royal Gold, through its subsidiary International Royalty, has agreed to acquire 100% of Great Bear Royalties (GBR) in a transaction valued at around US$153 millions. GBR's main asset is a 2% net smelter return royalty (NSR) that covers the entire Great Bear project and is indirectly owned by Kinross Gold, which acquired GBR last year.

References

External links

Gold mining companies of the United States
Companies based in Denver
Companies listed on the Nasdaq
Molybdenum mining